International Business School of Scandinavia - IBSS is a private business school based in Denmark.
Started in 2004, they are focused on privately run MBA programs through Blended learning.
Programs run both in English as well as local languages around the world together with local partners.

Programs
MBA in General Management, MBA in Human Resource, MBA in International Sales & Marketing.

The programs are a mix of theory and practice based training.

Through the training method "blended learning" participants can have international seminars from anywhere in the world and training material is supplied both online and during the face2face training.

Brief history
IBSS history started in 2000, as a subsidiary with the aim to conduct educations and degree programs.

In 2004 the official school was established.

2009 IBSS initiated international status with sub activities done online. Furthermore IBSS focus on international accreditation programs – which have not been of any need in Denmark but which are highly wanted internationally. IBSS collaborates with the a number of universities in countries such as Malaysia, UK, US, Bangladesh and Vietnam.

A brief about IBSS cooperation internationally; IBSS has distinguished history of relations with External educational organizations, institutions and Universities.

2009~ IBSS started its international Activities (outside of Scandinavian countries). Currently IBSS is conducting funding a PHD study with Aalborg University on the effects of blended learning in developing countries.

IBSS is running its own MBA programs but is also internationally conducting programs with universities in fields of diploma, BA and Doctorate programs.

One of IBSS major partners is Asia e University in Malaysia.

As of 2010 IBSS is conducting dual or single degrees in Bangladesh, Egypt, Malaysia and Vietnam.

References

External links

Business schools